Godinus (or Godin) succeeded his father Warnachar as mayor of the palace of Burgundy in 626 and held that post until 627.  He married his stepmother Bertha and the king, Clotaire II, hunted him down for this.  He fled to the court of Dagobert I, the king's son, in Austrasia, but Clotaire found him in Chartres and executed him.

Sources 
 Wallace-Hadrill, John Michael (1960): The Fourth Book of the Chronicle of Fredegar, Nelson, p. 44
 Fox, Yaniv (2014): Power and Religion in Merovingian Gaul: Columbanian Monasticism and the Formation of the Frankish Aristocracy, Cambridge University Press, p. 104

627 deaths
Mayors of the Palace
Year of birth unknown